WJCX (99.5 FM) is a radio station broadcasting a contemporary Christian format. Licensed to Pittsfield, Maine, United States, the station serves the Bangor area.  The station is owned by Calvary Chapel of Bangor.

History
The station went on the air as WFOV on November 13, 1989.  On July 9, 1993, the station changed its call sign to WPBC; on December 20, 1996, the station changed to the current WJCX.

References

External links

JCX
Radio stations established in 1989
Somerset County, Maine